Lena Löfstedt (née Olovsson, born July 31, 1955 in Västervik) is a former football player, who played as a midfielder and goalie.

Olovsson became Sweden's first female professional football player in 1975, when she was playing for the Italian team Sisal ACF Piacenza. Before that she played as a midfielder at FK Växjö.

References

1955 births
Living people
Expatriate women's footballers in Italy
People from Småland
Swedish women's footballers
Women's association footballers not categorized by position